Timebomb is a 1991 American science-fiction action film written and directed by Avi Nesher and starring Michael Biehn, Patsy Kensit, and Richard Jordan.

Plot
Mild-mannered watchmaker Eddy Kay (Michael Biehn) runs into a burning building to save a trapped woman and is featured in the news as a result. Watching the news, Colonel Taylor (Richard Jordan) is shocked to see Eddy, whom he had assumed to be dead. A game of cat and mouse begins as Eddy, with the help of psychiatrist Dr. Anna Nolmar (Patsy Kensit), tries to discover his past and why they want him dead.

Eddy and Dr. Nolmar discover that he was part of a secret government program to create assassins. Using various sensory deprivation and brainwashing techniques, the assassins could be sent to infiltrate other organizations and facilities undetected and carry out programmed missions.  Eddy manages to capture and interrogate one of the female assassins (Tracy Scoggins), finding out the Colonel's current assassination plan. He then plots to confront Colonel Taylor and put an end to the assassination program once and for all.

Cast
 Michael Biehn as Eddy Kaye
 Patsy Kensit as Anna Nolmar
 Richard Jordan as Col. Taylor
 Tracy Scoggins as Blue
 Billy Blanks as Mr. Brown
 Jim Maniaci as Mr. Grey
 Robert Culp as Phillips
 Raymond St. Jacques as Det. Sanchez
 Julius Zagon as Dr. Kosyez

Actress and comedian Julie Brown makes an uncredited cameo as a waitress at Al's Diner.

Production
The film was shot under the title Nameless with a budget of $7 million.

Producers originally wanted Jean-Claude Van Damme or Chuck Norris to play Kay, but Nesher saw Biehn as perfect for the role due to his performance in The Abyss.  Biehn himself took a pay cut to show his dedication to the film.

Biehn underwent intensive military training for several weeks to prepare for the role.

Release
MGM gave the film a limited theatrical release on September 27, 1991.

The film was released as a VOD title on DVD by MGM on December 23, 2011.

References

External links
 
 

1991 films
1990s English-language films
1990s science fiction films
Films directed by Avi Nesher
Films produced by Raffaella De Laurentiis
Metro-Goldwyn-Mayer films
American science fiction films
1990s American films